The Incredible Jazz Guitar of Wes Montgomery is an album by the American jazz guitarist Wes Montgomery. Most of its tracks exemplify two of Montgomery's distinguishing techniques: "thumb picking" and the use of octaves.

In 2017, the album was selected for the National Recording Registry by the Library of Congress as "culturally, historically, or artistically significant."

Reception 

The album is considered by many fans and critics to be the pinnacle of Montgomery's recorded studio work. The Penguin Guide to Jazz selected it as part of its suggested "Core Collection".

AllMusic critic Michael G. Nastos praised the album, writing: "Setting him apart from the rest, this recording established Montgomery as the most formidable modern guitarist of the era, and eventually its most influential...Montgomery is clearly talented beyond convention, consistently brilliant, and indeed incredible in the company of his sidemen, and this recording—an essential addition to every jazz guitarist fan's collection—put him on the map."

Of the CD reissue, critic Chris May of All About Jazz wrote: "The Incredible Jazz Guitar burst onto the US scene in 1960 like a benign hurricane, and it still sounds like a gale almost 50 years later... Montgomery—empathetically accompanied by pianist Tommy Flanagan, bassist Percy Heath (then riding high with the Modern Jazz Quartet), and drummer Albert Heath—makes the guitar sound like it never had before. It has sounded similar since, of course, thanks to the legion of Montgomery-influenced players, but rarely so close to perfection.... The Incredible Jazz Guitar endures, and will continue to do so."

Track listing
"Airegin" (Sonny Rollins) – 4:26
"D-Natural Blues" (Wes Montgomery) – 5:23
"Polka Dots and Moonbeams" (Jimmy Van Heusen, Johnny Burke) – 4:44
"Four on Six" (Montgomery) – 6:15
"West Coast Blues" (Montgomery, Granville Sascha Burland) – 7:26
"In Your Own Sweet Way" (Dave Brubeck) – 4:53
"Mr. Walker (Renie)" (Montgomery) – 4:33
"Gone With the Wind" (Allie Wrubel, Herb Magidson) – 6:24

Tracks 1, 2, 4, 5, and 6 recorded at Reeves Sound Studios, NYC, January 26, 1960
Tracks 3, 7, and 8 recorded at Reeves Sound Studios, NYC, January 28, 1960

Riverside RLP 12-320, RLP 1169; Fantasy OJC 036, OJCCD 036-2

Personnel 
Musicians
 Wes Montgomery – electric guitar
 Tommy Flanagan – piano
 Percy Heath – bass
 Albert Heath – drums

Production
 Orrin Keepnews – producer, liner notes
 Jack Higgins – engineer (recording)

 Paul Bacon-Ken Braren-Harris Lewine – design
 Lawrence N. Shustak – photography

References

Wes Montgomery albums
1960 albums
Albums produced by Orrin Keepnews
Riverside Records albums
Grammy Hall of Fame Award recipients
Original Jazz Classics albums
United States National Recording Registry recordings
United States National Recording Registry albums